Oriana is a given name, primarily of a female, that is widespread in Europe. Variants include Orianna, Oriane or Orianne.

Sometimes Orian, Oreste or Dorian may be a male given name or a family name, as Orians, Oriani, or Doria.

Possible roots of the name

There is the Latin meaning of rising (as in sunrise; see a similar word root in Orient).

Things get even more complicated as in the languages of the Iberian peninsula, namely Spanish and Portuguese, there is the medieval Oroana or Ouroana, from Oro or Ouro meaning Gold, whose origin is the Latin Aurum, and whose root, Aur, may be related to Ori.

The Irish version of this name means ' the golden one' and stems from 'Ór' which is the Irish for gold.

Notable people
Notable people with the name include:
Nickname for English queen Elizabeth I; the Oriana madrigals were written for her.
Oriana Wilson (1876-1945), MBE, British humanitarian and wife of explorer Edward Adrian Wilson
Oriana Fallaci (1929-2006), Italian journalist, author, political 
Oriana Clare Tickell, Dame Clare Tickell
Oriana Panozzo, Australian actress
Oriana Scheuss, Swiss Olympic sport shooter
Oriana Civile, Sicilian folk singer and ethnomusicologist, exponent of Sicilian oral tradition and of world music interviewer, and World War II partisan
Oriana Small, birth name of Ashley Blue, US actress
Oriana Cottrell (born 1980's) Ceramicist, Jeweler and Flamenco Dancer
Oriane Lassus (born 1987), author, cartoonist, illustrator
Oriana Guerrero (born 1994), Colombian volleyball player
Oriana Sabatini, Argentine actress, model and singer

Fictional characters
Oriana, heiress to the throne of Great Britain and beloved of Amadis de Gaula, in Oriana by Garci Rodríguez de Montalvo
Oriana, fairy and main character in the children's book A Fada Oriana, by Portuguese writer Sophia de Mello Breyner Andresen
Oriane de Guermantes, Duchesse de Guermantes, character in Marcel Proust's novel In Search of Lost Time
Oriana, the princess whom the protagonist of Felix the Cat: The Movie must save, as well as the name of the land she rules over
Orianna, the daughter of Talon and Oria in the metal opera Days of Rising Doom by Aina
Oureana, Moorish princess who converted to Christianity in 12th-century Portugal
Oriane, a character in the novel Labyrinth by Kate Mosse
Orianna, The Lady of Clockwork, a character in the video game League of Legends
Oriana, genetic twin of Miranda Lawson in the video game Mass Effect 2
Oriana, subject of the poem by the same name by Alfred, Lord Tennyson
Orianna Spearling, a character in the novel The Walls Around Us by Nova Ren Suma
Oriana de la Force, a villainous lawyer in the book series Conspiracy 365 by Gabrielle Lord.

Ships 
 SS Oriana (1959)
 MV Oriana (1995)

Feminine given names